In the Country Fell a Star (Italian: In campagna è caduta una stella) is a 1939 Italian comedy film directed by Eduardo De Filippo. It stars De Filippo, his brother Peppino De Filippo and Rosina Lawrence. When a famous American film star visits their small town, two brothers become obsessed with her and neglect their fiancées. It was based on the play A Coperchia è caduta una stella written in 1933 by Peppino De Filippo.

Cast
 Rosina Lawrence as Margaret, l'americana 
 Eduardo De Filippo as Pasquale Montuori 
 Peppino De Filippo as Luigino Montuori 
 Oretta Fiume as Rosina, la fidanzata di Luigino 
 Dolores Palumbo as Clotilde 
 Gorella Gori as La moglie de Teodorico 
 Elena Altieri as La cognata di Margaret 
 Adele Mosso as Zia Rita 
 Gina Amendola as La governante di casa Montuori 
 Armando Migliari as Teodorico, il farmacista 
 Guido Notari as Il suocero di Margaret 
 Edoardo Toniolo as Il fidanzato di Margaret 
 Emilio Petacci as Il padre di Clotilde

References

Bibliography 
 Moliterno, Gino. Historical Dictionary of Italian Cinema. Scarecrow Press, 2008.

External links 

1939 films
Italian comedy films
1939 comedy films
1930s Italian-language films
Films directed by Eduardo De Filippo
Films set in Italy
Italian black-and-white films
Films shot at Tirrenia Studios
1930s Italian films